Simon Ellis may refer to:

 Simon Ellis (record producer), producer and musical director
 Simon Ellis (film director), British film director
 Simon Ellis (sailor), Hong Kong sailor